The Goa Science Centre is a science museum, located on New Marine Highway, Miramar, Panjim. It is a joint project of a division of India's National Council of Science Museums (NCSM) and Goa's Department of Science Technology & Environment.

Objective

The centre aims to "...inculcate a scientific temper particularly among the young generation and to popularize science by bringing the excitement of Science & Technology for the common people."

Science Centre
It includes a park with exotic flowers, where visitors can learn and interact with large exhibits of principles of physics. Most exhibits give visitors the opportunity to participate actively, e.g. requiring people to lift themselves using pulleys and ropes. Activities are tailored to children, so they enjoy exploring, experiencing and learning about science.

The centre also houses interactive exhibits inside the building and presents Science Shows for young children daily. The Digital Planetarium, 3-D Film Shows, Science Demonstration Lectures, Science Film Shows, Taramandal Shows and the Cyberlab Shows are suitable for all ages.

The Science Centre has an air-conditioned auditorium seating 140, where the Science Film Shows and other multimedia presentations are shown. The Cyberlab is a Multimedia Computer Lab designed to demonstrate and spread IT awareness to the public. There are two thematic galleries: Fun Science and Science of Oceans.

See also
 Swami Vivekananda Planetarium, Mangalore

References

External links

Museums in Goa
Science museums in India
Planetaria in India
Museums established in 2001
2001 establishments in Goa
Buildings and structures in Panaji
Science and technology in Goa
Education in Panaji
Tourist attractions in Panaji